Bang Kaeo is a town (Thesaban Mueang) which covers the entire Bang Kaeo Subdistrict, located in the Bang Phli District (Amphoe) of Samut Prakan Province in the Bangkok Metropolitan Region of Central Thailand. In 2019, it had a total population of 59,478 people.

References

Populated places in Samut Prakan province